Rebellion Developments Limited is a British video game developer based in Oxford, England. Founded by Jason and Chris Kingsley in December 1992, the company is best known for its Sniper Elite series and multiple games in the Alien vs. Predator series. Sister company Rebellion Publishing has published comic books since 2000, when it purchased 2000 AD, the publisher of characters such as Judge Dredd and Rogue Trooper.

History

Origins (1992–1999)
Rebellion was founded on 4 December 1992 by brothers Jason and Chris Kingsley in Oxford, England. The pair had just finished academic degrees at the University of Oxford, and had ambitions of starting doctorates. In their spare time, they did freelance work in the games industry. When their freelance jobs roles began to expand and they were taking on more management responsibilities, they decided to establish Rebellion in Oxford. The foundation of the studio was laid when the brothers secured a deal with video game publisher Atari UK. They presented a 3D dragon flight game demo to directors at the publisher, who were seeking games for the upcoming Atari Jaguar system. They were commissioned by Atari to work on two titles for the Jaguar, Checkered Flag and Alien vs Predator, which both released in 1994. The development team was expanded to assist with work on these games. It included artists Stuart Wilson, Toby Banfield, and Justin Rae and programmers Mike Beaton, Rob Dibley, and Andrew Whittaker. Following Alien vs Predator, Rebellion saw no releases for some years, with their next project, the intentionally light-hearted PC game Mr. Tank, going unpublished.

Expansion and comics (2000–2009)
Over the course of the decade, Rebellion underwent rapid expansion with numerous acquisitions of other studios and properties. This wave of expansions included the purchase of 2000 AD from Fleetway Publications, which began Rebellion's first foray into comic books. In addition to further publications under the label, Rebellion began to develop associated characters for the games market. In 2003 Rebellion released the game Judge Dredd: Dredd vs. Death.

In 2004, Rebellion entered a deal with DC Comics to reprint several 2000 AD stories in trade paperback form, including Judge Dredd, Strontium Dog, Nikolai Dante, and Sinister Dexter. When DC left the venture, citing poor sales, Rebellion created its own line of American graphic novels, distributed through Simon & Schuster. In 2005 Rebellion also created the Judge Dredd: The Complete Case Files series, which has begun reprinting almost every appearance of Judge Dredd in chronological order.

Rebellion's 2005 game Sniper Elite was awarded "Best PC/Console Game" in the TIGA Awards of 2005. Following the release, Rebellion acquired numerous games studios and properties. This began in 2006 with the purchase of Tomb Raider developers Core Design from Eidos Interactive, as well as Strangelite from Empire Interactive, and Elixir Studios' former IPs including Evil Genius and Republic: The Revolution. The acquisitions made Rebellion the largest independent game developer in Europe.

Acquisitions later in the decade were predominantly associated with the growing publishing wing of the company, including Blackfish Publishing and Mongoose Publishing in 2008, followed by Cubicle 7 and Solaris Books in 2009.

Closure of Derby studio (2009–2010)

In 2009, Rebellion's Rogue Warrior game received poor reviews. This was followed by Aliens vs. Predator in 2010, published by Sega, which received a mixed critical reception, but debuted at number one on the UK all formats chart. Significant changes were made in 2010, including staff cuts at their main studio in Oxford as well as the closure of Rebellion Derby – the former Core Design studio which had only been purchased four years previously. Studio CEO Jason Kingsley discussed pivoting their focus to smaller titles in the wake of the changes. The move coincided with the end of a property lease. Kingsley commented that "growth is sometimes painful, never more so than in the current climate and we have had to take a long hard look at how we operate our studio network. Strategically we have decided to review the need for the Derby facilities."

Return to growth (2011–present)
The mid 2010s saw major successes with the Sniper Elite franchise. The company returned to expansion through the purchase of additional studios and properties, expanding both their computer game and publishing sectors, and further diversified into live action film late in the decade. Kingsley was awarded an OBE in 2012 for his work supporting the sector.

In July 2013, Rebellion bought the Battlezone and the Moonbase Commander franchises during the Atari bankruptcy proceedings. Cubicle 7 left Rebellion in December 2014 via management buyout. Sniper Elite III was released that year, and by September 2015 the series had passed 10 million copies sold worldwide.

In August 2016, Rebellion acquired the post-1970 IPC Youth and Fleetway comics libraries from Egmont. It reprinted these under its Treasury of British Comics imprint, including Roy of the Rovers, Wildcat and One-Eyed Jack. This would be followed by an acquisition of the pre-1970 titles from the group in 2018.

In November 2018, Rebellion set up a studio for film and TV series based on 2000 AD characters, the first projects being Judge Dredd: Mega-City One and Rogue Trooper, both directed by Duncan Jones. Rebellion Productions, the film production arm founded in 2017, would occupy a disused newspaper factory in Didcot, England. The studio would launch its first feature film in 2021.

Several games related acquisitions would be made through 2018 and 2019, including the Radiant Worlds, rebranded "Rebellion Warwick" and TickTock games, rebranded "Rebellion North". Rebellion acquired The Bitmap Brothers' library of classic games in 2019.

In 2020 Rebellion acquired Whitaker's Almanack, publishing an edition in the following year, but it announced that there would be no 2022 edition.

In 2021 Rebellion announced a new bi-monthly humour comic, Monster Fun, would begin in 2022.

Subsidiaries

Active 
 Audiomotion Studios (acquired in 2003)
 Rebellion Film Studios
 Rebellion Liverpool (acquired in 2006)
 Rebellion North (acquired in 2019)
 Rebellion Publishing
 2000 AD
 Abaddon Books
 Ravenstone Press
 Solaris Books
 Rebellion Unplugged
 Rebellion Warwick (acquired in 2018)

Defunct 
 Razorworks (acquired in 2008)
 Rebellion Banbury (acquired in 2007)
 Rebellion Derby (acquired in 2006)

Games

Games developed

Games published 
 Evil Genius (2009, PC). Originally developed by Elixir Studios and published in 2004.
 Republic: The Revolution (2009, PC). Originally developed by Elixir Studios and published in 2003.
 Empire Earth (2009, PC). Originally developed by Stainless Steel Studios and published in 2001. The expansion pack was released in 2002.
 Ground Control (2009, PC). Originally developed by Massive Entertainment and published in 2000.
 Ground Control II: Operation Exodus (2009, PC). Originally developed by Massive Entertainment and published in 2004.
 Lords of the Realm (2009, PC). Originally developed by Impressions Games and published in 1994. This includes Lords of the Realm II published in 1996.
 Lords of the Realm III (2009, PC). Originally developed by Impressions Games and published in 2004.
 Lords of Magic (2009, PC). Originally developed by Impressions Games and published in 1998.
 Woolfe: The Red Hood Diaries (2015, PC). Originally developed by GriN Gamestudio and published in 2015.
 Battlezone 98 Redux (2016, PC). Developed by Big Boat Interactive.
 Battlezone: Combat Commander (2018, PC). Developed by Big Boat Interactive.

References

External links 
 
 Rebellion Developments' profile at MobyGames

 
1992 establishments in England
British companies established in 1992
Comic book publishing companies of the United Kingdom
Companies based in Oxford
Publishing companies established in 1992
Publishing companies of England
Video game companies established in 1992
Video game companies of the United Kingdom
Video game development companies
Privately held companies of England